Tiit Helmja (born 19 July 1945) is an Estonian rower who competed for Soviet Union at the 1968 Summer Olympics in Mexico City with the men's coxed pair where they qualified for the small final but did not start. At the 1971 European Rowing Championships in Copenhagen, he won bronze with the men's eight. At the 1973 European Rowing Championships in Moscow, he won silver with the men's coxless four.

References

1945 births
Living people
People from Häädemeeste Parish
Soviet male rowers
Estonian male rowers
Olympic rowers of the Soviet Union
Rowers at the 1968 Summer Olympics
Rowers at the 1976 Summer Olympics
European Rowing Championships medalists